Emmy Henriëtte "Riëtte" Fledderus (born 18 October 1977) is a retired volleyball player from the Netherlands, who represented her native country at the 1996 Summer Olympics in Atlanta, Georgia, finishing in fifth place.

Fledderus was a member of the Netherlands national team that won the gold medal at the 1995 European Championship by defeating Croatia 3–0 in the final. She was also part of the team during the 2007 Boris Yeltsin Cup in Yekaterinburg where the Dutch won the silver medal after losing the final to China 3–1.

References
 Dutch Olympic Committee  

1977 births
Dutch women's volleyball players
Volleyball players at the 1996 Summer Olympics
Olympic volleyball players of the Netherlands
Sportspeople from Drenthe
People from Meppel
People from Westerveld 
Living people